Chords (or Jens Eric Resch Thomason; born 12 August 1978 in Lund) is a Swedish musician. He has his own studio and label called Svart Lax but was previously signed to Timbuktu's label JuJu Records, together with J-Ro of The Alkaholiks among others. The rapper/musician released his first single in 2001 and has since gained national fame in Sweden through his music, and most notably when his group Helt Off with Timbuktu made the title track for the Swedish film Babylonsjukan.

Discography

Albums
 2003: Chords - The Garden Around The Mansion
 2004: Helt Off - Helt Off
 2006: Helt Off - I Huset
 2006: Chords - The Garden Around The Mansion (U.S. Release)
 2007: Chords - Something To Chew On (Bootleg)
 2008: Chords - Things We Do For Things
 2012: Chords - Looped State Of Mind
2020: Chords - Poisson Noir_sans bars

Singles / EPs
 2001: Chords & Scissors - "Urinall Disses"
 2001: Smuts & Co. - "Lågbudget"
 2002: Chords - "Idiot Savant"
 2003: Chords feat. Timbuktu & Rantoboko - "Chillin' (Like Matt Dillon)"
 2004: Chords - "Wrap Your Chops"
 2006: Chords - "Get Off Mi Couch" (U.S. Release)
 2008: Chords - "Appetite for Consumption" (feat. Timbuktu)
 2012: Chords - "The Dude / Song for You"

Filmography
2004: Babylonsjukan
2005: Timbuktu - "Funken Styr Våra Steg" (DVD, 2005)

References
Biography at JuJu Records
Chords ser fram emot ny hiphopvåg

External links
Official site

1978 births
Living people
Swedish reggae musicians